Aşağıkaraören Reservoir is an artificial lake constructed in 1978 for irrigation purposes at Aşağı Karaören village of Kahramankazan district in Ankara Province, Turkey. It is fed by the Kuzoğlu Creek. The development was backed by the Turkish State Hydraulic Works.

See also
List of dams and reservoirs in Turkey

References

Reservoirs in Turkey
Landforms of Ankara Province
Dams completed in 1978